Ferdinando Scala (born May 24, 1969) is an Italian biologist, science and technology journalist  and historian, specialized in strategy and military history.

Biography 
Born in Portici, he spent his first year of life in Foggia, where his father was servicing as a warrant officer of the Italian Air Force, and then he moved to San Giorgio a Cremano, that he then always considered his hometown. Here he frequented elementary and middle school, and then he spent the first two years of high school at Liceo Classico Statale "Quinto Orazio Flacco" of Portici.

A cadet of the class 1984-87 of Nunziatella Military School of Naples, he studied together with Antonio Mele, Marco Mattiucci, Valerio Gildoni, Antonio De Crescentiis, and Bepi Pezzulli. Admitted at Military Academy of Modena as a cadet officer of 169º class, he resigned and enrolled as a student of biological sciences of the University of Naples Federico II.

Graduated summa cum laude in March 1995, he spent one year of research work at  CNR-ISPAIM institute of Ercolano, then in January 1997 he won a yearly research fellowship and he was assigned to the Centre d'Ecologie Fonctionelle et Evolutive, a CNRS institute of  Montpellier. In this period, he performed research activity in the field of satellite and airborne remote sensing applications to environmental monitoring in collaboration with the Joint Research Center of the European Commission and DLR. He further collaborated with European Space Agency to the ENVISAT mission, and finally he participated as author to the Italian National Communication to Fight Desertification in the UNCCD framework.

Having abandoned his scientific career, in 1998 he moved to the pharmaceutical industry, where he held positions in Italy and abroad in marketing & sales for Abbott, Menarini, Takeda, Serono, Bristol-Myers Squibb, Allergan, and living between Florence, Rome and Dublin. In 2010 he moved to management consulting in Publicis Groupe, also in the pharmaceutical sector, working at global level for Healthware International as Strategy Director. Since 2014 he has been teaching Pharmaceutical Marketing and Management at Alma Laboris Business School in Rome. Between 2016 and 2020, he served as a Board Member of Select Milano, a conservative think-tank and business diplomacy initiative, with the mission to foster bilateral relations with the City of London after Brexit. In 2020 he started working as a contributor to the science, information security and technology magazine Infosec.news, founded by Umberto Rapettoand he qualified as a journalist on September 22, 2022.

He began publishing in the field of military history in 2016, making a monographic contribution to the history of the Nunziatella after discovering the lack of a name on the war memorial of the Academy inaugurated in 1920. In 2018, after five years of research, he published a biographical volume on General Armando Tallarigo, commander first of the 152nd Infantry Regiment and then of the Sassari Brigade during the First World War. In this work, presented at the International Festival èStoria in Gorizia, he brought back to historical reality the events narrated by Emilio Lussu in the volume Un anno sull'altipiano (One year on the High Plateau), and then taken up again in fictional form by Francesco Rosi in the movie Many Wars Ago (Uomini contro). In 2019 he published with historians Paolo Gaspari and Paolo Pozzato the encyclopedic volume The Italian Generals of Great War, C-Z (I generali italiani della Grande guerra, C-Z), an important contribution to the historiography of the First World War on the Italian Front, published in collaboration with the Historical Office of the General Staff of the Italian Army. The following year, he participated in the book La religione civile di un popolo (The Civil Religion of a People), dedicated to re-evaluating Italy's contribution to the Great War through the monuments that commemorate the fallen and to reinterpreting the First World War as a fundamental moment in the construction of the nation. The book attracted significant attention from the press and the RAI national television.

Since 2020 he has been a member of the Italian Society for Military History and his current research interests are focused on the history of the Carabinieri and the relationship between military hierarchies and Italian Fascism.

Books 

 Ferdinando Scala, Il caduto dimenticato – la breve Grande Guerra di Federico Mensingher. Associazione Nazionale Ex Allievi Nunziatella, Napoli 2016. Full text.
 Ferdinando Scala, Il generale Armando Tallarigo – dalla leggenda della Brigata Sassari al dopoguerra. Gaspari Editore, Udine 2018. 
 Paolo Gaspari, Paolo Pozzato, Ferdinando Scala, I generali italiani della Grande guerra, Atlante biografico C-Z. Gaspari Editore, Udine 2019. 
 Paolo Gaspari, Paolo Pozzato, Ferdinando Scala, I generali: Emanuele Filiberto di Savoia-Aosta, Antonio Edoardo Chinotto, Tommaso Monti, Giuseppe Paolini, Giovanni Prelli, Fulvio Riccieri, Ferruccio Trombi, Achille Papa, Alceo Cattalochino. In: AA.VV. La religione civile di un popolo. Carso, Redipuglia, Oslavia, il cimitero degli Eroi di Aquileia. Gaspari Editore, Udine 2020. .
 Ferdinando Scala, La Nunziatella nella Grande Guerra 1915-1918 - I generali. Associazione Nazionale Ex Allievi Nunziatella, Napoli, 2021. Full text.

References

Citations

Bibliography

External links

Profile on Academia.edu
Journalist articles on Infosec.news

University of Naples Federico II alumni
Living people
1969 births
Italian biologists
Italian journalists
Military historians